Jan Dara the Beginning is a 2012 Thai erotic-period-drama film that is based on a novel by Pramool Unhathoop, The Story of Jan Dara.

Plot
Based on a famous Thai erotic novel, the film tells the story of Jan, a boy who grows up in a house lorded over by his sadistic and debauched father, Luang Wisnan. Set in the 1930s the story recounts the growing pains of Jan, whose mother dies while giving birth to him and who's intensely hated by his father. Jan grows up with Aunt Wad, his stepmother, and he struggles to reconcile his guilt and longing with different women in his life, including a girl called Hyacinth, whom he adores, and later Madame Boonleung, his father's lover who becomes a key to Jan's sexual awakening.

Cast
Mario Maurer - Jan Dara
Sakarat Ritthumrong - Luang Vissanun-decha (Jan Dara's Father)
Bongkot Kongmalai - Aunt Waad
Sawika Chaiyadech - Hi-sinh / Dara (Jan Dara's Mother)
Rhatha Phongam - Boonlueang
 Chaiyapol Julien Poupart - Ken Krating-thong
Nishino Shō - Khun Kaew
Nutt Devahastin - Khun Ka-jorn

See also
Jan Dara: The Finale

References

External links
 

2012 films
Thai drama films